Easy Money is a 1917 American silent drama film directed by Travers Vale and starring Ethel Clayton, John Bowers and Frank Mayo. It was shot at World Film's Fort Lee studios in New Jersey.

Cast
 Ethel Clayton as Lois Page 
 John Bowers as Richard Chanslor 
 Frank Mayo as Robert Hildreth 
 Louise Vale as Lily Lorraine 
 Jack Drumier as Peter K. Chanslor 
 Charles Morgan as Sidney McCall

References

Bibliography
 Rita Ecke Altomara. Hollywood on the Palisades: a filmography of silent features made in Fort Lee, New Jersey, 1903-1927. Garland, 1983.

External links
 

1917 films
1917 drama films
1910s English-language films
American silent feature films
Silent American drama films
Films directed by Travers Vale
American black-and-white films
World Film Company films
Films shot in Fort Lee, New Jersey
1910s American films